The Universidad Nicaragüense de Ciencia y Tecnologia (UCYT) is a private university in Managua, fue fundada el 13 de octubre del 2003, se constituye legalmente la Asociación de Universidad Nicaragüense de Ciencia y Tecnología, la cual es aprobada su personería jurídica por la Asamblea Nacional de Nicaragua el día 26 de abril del año 2004. Se encuentra inscrita en el Consejo Nacional de Universidad y en el Registro y Control Asociaciones del Ministerio de Gobernación.

References

External links
 

Universities in Nicaragua
Educational institutions established in 2002
2002 establishments in Nicaragua